Life Upside Down is a 2022 American romantic comedy film directed and written by Cecilia Miniucchi. It stars Bob Odenkirk, Danny Huston, Radha Mitchell and Rosie Fellner.

Shot remotely during the early months of the COVID-19 pandemic in 2020, the film premiered at the 79th Venice Film Festival on September 1, 2022. It was released in limited theaters and video on demand on January 27, 2023.  It is scheduled to stream on AMC+ in April 2023.

Premise
In March 2020, during the COVID-19 lockdowns three couples are uprooted from their high-society lives. They are now trapped in their individual Los Angeles homes and are forced to spend all day and night with their significant other.

Cast
 Bob Odenkirk as Jonathan Wigglesworth
 Danny Huston as Paul Hasselberg
 Radha Mitchell as Clarissa Cranes
 Rosie Fellner as Rita Hasselberg

Production
Under the working title Worlds Apart, the film was shot during the COVID-19 pandemic remotely over Zoom in May and June 2020 in Los Angeles.

Release
Life Upside Down premiered at the 79th Venice Film Festival on September 1, 2021.  IFC Films acquired North American distribution rights and released the film in limited theaters and video on demand on January 27, 2023.  It is scheduled to stream on AMC+ in April 2023.

In its opening weekend it grossed $2,419 at 27 theaters.  It went on to make a total of $4,467 in the United States and Canada.

Reception
Review aggregator Rotten Tomatoes reports that 5% of 19 critics have given the film a positive review, with an average rating of 4.4 out of 10. Metacritic gives the film a weighted average rating of 37 out of 100, based on 8 reviews, indicating "generally unfavorable reviews".

References

External links

2022 romantic comedy films
2022 films
2020s American films
2020s English-language films
American romantic comedy films
Films set in Los Angeles
Films shot in Los Angeles
Films about the COVID-19 pandemic